Ali Hassan may refer to:

 Ali Hasan, an eleven-year-old Bahraini boy arrested for allegedly participating in a protest during the 2011 Bahraini uprising; see Arrest of Ali Hasan
 Ali Hasan (born 1965), Kuwaiti fencer
 Alihassan Turabi (born 1972), Indian actor
 Ali Hassan (comedian), Canadian comedian
 Ali Hassan (footballer), Mozambican footballer
 Ali Said Hassan (born 1950), Somali film producer and director
 Ali Hassan or SypherPK (born 1996), American streamer and YouTuber